Vacation Express is a tour operator based in Atlanta, Georgia.  The company was founded in 1989. Vacation Express was purchased by Sunwing Travel Group in 2011 for an undisclosed sum. The company has sold over two million vacation packages.

History
Vacation Express was founded in 1989 by Kevin Hernandez, Gantt Cookson and Meg Deeb. The company's initial offering was air/land vacation packages to Jamaica.  In 1992, the company began a charter flight from Atlanta to Cancun and eventually became known as a charter operator in the Southeast and Midwest. By 1998, Vacation Express sold packages from nine U.S. cities to Cancun, Cozumel, Aruba and Costa Rica. That year, Vacation Express was purchased for $24 million by the subsidiary of Airtours International Airways, North America Leisure Group. As part of the acquisition the Vacation Express began offering cruises, expanded its services into the Mid-Atlantic region and listed Baltimore as a chartered gateway. After ten years in business, the company had grown to sell travel packages to 100,000 customers annually by 1999. In 2003, Vacation Express was purchased by Flightserv Inc., a travel services division of  Capital Group, along with another tour operator for $16.5 million.

In 2011, Sunwing Travel Group purchased Vacation Express for an undisclosed sum.  As a result of the sale Sunwing Airlines, a subsidiary of Sunwing Travel Group, sells fares through Vacation Express. The company also sells charters flights through many airlines including Aeroméxico, Interjet, and IAero Airways.

References

External links
 Official website

Travel and holiday companies of the United States
Transport companies established in 1989
2011 mergers and acquisitions
American subsidiaries of foreign companies
Companies based in Atlanta
1989 establishments in Georgia (U.S. state)